Snakes Plain is a small rural locality approximately  south-west of Warren on the Oxley Highway in the local government area of Warren Shire, part of the Orana region of New South Wales, Australia.

Despite the arid climate of the area, the Auscott Macquarie Valley irrigated cotton farm is located within the locality.

The Auscott siding, part of the Warren railway line, which serves the cotton processing facility, is located in Snakes Plain.

The topography is flat with a Köppen climate classification of BsK (Hot semi arid).

References

Towns in New South Wales
Warren Shire